Reem Alabali-Radovan (born 1990) is a German politician who has been serving as a Member of the Bundestag for the Social Democratic Party (SPD) since 2021. 

In addition to her parliamentary work, Alabali-Radovan also currently serves as Minister of State at the Chancellery and Federal Commissioner for Migration, Refugees and Integration in Chancellor Olaf Scholz's cabinet since 2021. She is the first person of Iraqi descent in the Bundestag.

Early life 
Alabali-Radovan was born in Moscow in 1990. Her parents, Iraqi Assyrians who oppposed the regime of Saddam Hussein, had moved to the Soviet Union in the 1980s to study engineering. Her grandfather, Muhammad Salih Alabali, was an Iraqi resistance leader who was killed by the Ba’ath regime. In 1996, the family sought, and received asylum in Germany, settling in Mecklenburg-Vorpommern. She completed her school education at the Gymnasium Fridericianum Schwerin. Alabali graduated with a bachelor's degree in political science from the Free University of Berlin and has started a master's degree program (distance learning) in Sustainable Development Cooperation at the Technical University of Kaiserslautern.

Political career 
In 2020, Alabali-Radovan was appointed Commissioner for integration of the Mecklenburg-Western Pomerania state government. At the 2021 German federal election she was elected in the constituency of Schwerin – Ludwigslust-Parchim I – Nordwestmecklenburg I, defeating incumbent Dietrich Monstadt of the CDU. 

Within her parliamentary group, Alabali-Radovan belongs to the Parliamentary Left, a left-wing movement.

On 8 December 2021, the Scholz cabinet appointed Alabali-Radovan as Federal Commissioner for Migration, Refugees and Integration with the rank of a Minister of State in the Federal Chancellery. Since 23 February 2022, she has additionally served as the Federal Government Commissioner for Anti-Racism.

References

External links

Living people
1990 births
Members of the Bundestag for Mecklenburg-Western Pomerania
Parliamentary State Secretaries of Germany
Immigration ministers
German anti-racism activists
21st-century German women politicians
Female members of the Bundestag
German people of Iraqi descent
Members of the Bundestag 2021–2025
Members of the Bundestag for the Social Democratic Party of Germany
Free University of Berlin alumni
21st-century German politicians
People of Iraqi-Assyrian descent